These are the rosters of all participating teams at the men's water polo tournament at the 1992 Summer Olympics in Barcelona.

Rosters

Australia
The following players represented Australia:

Simon Asher
Geoffrey Clark
John Fox
Daniel Marsden
Raymond Mayers
Greg McFadden
Guy Newman
Mark Oberman
Paul Oberman
Troy Stockwell
Glenn Townsend
Andrew Wightman
Chris Wybrow

Cuba
The following players represented Cuba:

Juan Carlos Barreras
Norge Blay
Pablo Cuesta
Marcelo Derouville
Bárbaro Díaz
Lazaro Fernández
Ernesto García Pinheiro
Juan Hernández Olivera
Juan Hernández Silveira
Guillermo Martínez Luis
Iván Pérez
José Ángel Ramos
Jorge del Valle

Czechoslovakia
The following players represented Czechoslovakia:

Štefan Kmeťo
Ladislav Vidumanský
Tomáš Bundschuh
Roman Polačik
Vidor Borsig
Peter Horňák
Eduard Balúch
Pavol Dindžík
Roman Bačík
Peter Veszelits
Miroslav Jančich
Július Iždinský

France
The following players represented France:

Thierry Alimondo
François Besson
Émmanuel Charlot
Émmanuel Ducher
Pierre Garsau
Christophe Gautier
Christian Grimaldi
Nicolas Jeleff
Pascal Loustenau
Gilles Madelenat
Vincent de Nardi
Jean-Marie Olivon
Patrice Tillie

Germany
The following players represented Germany:

Ingo Borgmann
Piotr Bukowski
Jörg Dresel
Torsten Dresel
Carsten Kusch
Frank Otto
Raúl de la Peña
Reibel Guido
René Reimann
Peter Röhle
Hagen Stamm
Uwe Sterzik
Dirk Theismann

Greece
The following players represented Greece:

Dimitrios Bitsakos
Kyriakos Giannopoulos
Filippos Kaiafas
Theodoros Lorantos
Konstantinos Loudis
Georgios Mavrotas
Tasos Papanastasiou
Evangelos Pateros
Vangelis Patras
Epaminondas Samartzidis
Dimitrios Seletopoulos
Nikolaos Venetopoulos
Gerasimos Voltyrakis

Hungary
The following players represented Hungary:

Tibor Benedek
István Dóczi
András Gyöngyösi
Péter Kuna
Gábor Nemes
Imre Péter
Zsolt Petőváry
Gábor Schmiedt
Frank Tóth
Imre Tóth
László Tóth
Zsolt Varga
Balázs Vincze

Italy
The following players represented Italy:

Francesco Attolico
Gianni Averaimo
Alessandro Bovo
Alessandro Campagna
Paolo Caldarella
Marco D'Altrui
Massimiliano Ferretti
Mario Fiorillo
Ferdinando Gandolfi
Amedeo Pomilio
Francesco Porzio
Giuseppe Porzio
Carlo Silipo

Netherlands
The following players represented the Netherlands:

Marc van Belkum
Bert Brinkman
Arie van de Bunt
Robert Havekotte
Koos Issard
John Jansen
Gijsbert van der Leden
Harry van der Meer
Hans Nieuwenburg
Remco Pielstroom
John Scherrenburg
Jalo de Vries
Jan Wagenaar

Spain
The following players represented Spain:

Daniel Ballart
Manuel Estiarte
Pedro Francisco García
Salvador Gómez
Marco Antonio González
Rubén Michavila
Miguel Ángel Oca
Sergi Pedrerol
Josep Picó
Jesús Rollán
Ricardo Sánchez
Jordi Sans
Manuel Silvestre

Unified Team
The following players represented the Unified Team:

Dmitri Apanassenko
Andrei Belofastov
Evgueni Charonov
Dmitry Gorshkov
Vladimir Karaboutov
Aleksandr Kolotov
Alexandre Kovalenko
Nikolay Kozlov
Serguei Markotch
Sergey Naumov
Alexandre Ogorodnikov
Alexandre Tchuguir
Alexei Vdovine

United States
The following players represented the United States:

Jeff Campbell
Christopher Duplanty
Mike Evans
Kirk Everist
Erich Fischer
Charles Harris
Chris Humbert
Douglas Kimbell
Craig Klass
Alex Rousseau
Terry Schroeder
John Vargas
Craig Wilson

References

Men's team rosters
 
1992